The 2002 Insurrextion was the third annual Insurrextion professional wrestling pay-per-view event produced by the American promotion, World Wrestling Federation (WWF, now WWE). It was held exclusively for wrestlers from the promotion's Raw brand division, which made it the promotion's first-ever Raw-exclusive PPV. The event took place on 4 May 2002, at the Wembley Arena in London, England and was broadcast exclusively in the United Kingdom.

This event was the last live televised event to run under the WWF name. Due to a lawsuit by the World Wildlife Fund over the "WWF" initialism, the promotion quietly changed its name to World Wrestling Entertainment (WWE) over the next two days. The company officially began to use the WWE name beginning with the 6 May 2002, episode of Raw. Thus, it was the last WWF PPV of the Attitude Era. This was also the company's last PPV to be held in London until Money in the Bank in 2023.

In addition, a series of notorious incidents on the return flight to the United States occurred, which has been referred to as the "plane ride from hell". Wrestlers Scott Hall and Curt Hennig were fired following the event for their involvement in the incidents, while Goldust and Ric Flair were also reprimanded by the company for their involvement in other incidents during the flight.

Production

Background
Insurrextion was an annual United Kingdom-exclusive pay-per-view (PPV) produced by the American professional wrestling promotion, World Wrestling Federation (WWF, now WWE), since 2000. The 2002 event was the third event in the Insurrextion chronology and was held on May 4 at the Wembley Arena in London, England. It was also the first Insurrextion produced under the brand extension introduced in March, which divided the roster into two separate brands, Raw and SmackDown!, where wrestlers were exclusively assigned to perform. The 2002 event was in turn made exclusive to wrestlers of the Raw brand, which was the promotion's first Raw-exclusive PPV produced.

Storylines
The event featured nine professional wrestling matches and two pre-show matches that involved different wrestlers from pre-existing scripted feuds and storylines. Wrestlers portrayed villains, heroes, or less distinguishable characters in the scripted events that built tension and culminated in a wrestling match or series of matches.

Aftermath
The 2002 Insurrextion was the final PPV produced under the WWF name as the company was renamed to World Wrestling Entertainment (WWE) just two days after the event. This name change came as a result of a lawsuit from the World Wildlife Fund over the "WWF" initialism. This would also be the company's last PPV held in London until Money in the Bank in 2023.

"The Plane Ride from Hell"
During the flight back to the United States, a series of incidents occurred that has been referred to as the "plane ride from hell", which has been described as one of professional wrestling's most infamous scandals. The Boeing 757 plane that was chartered included an open bar, and many of the wrestlers indulged. This led to many incidents, including physical altercations and the sexual harassment of two female flight attendants, Taralyn Cappellano and Heidi Doyle. Scott Hall had a history of alcoholism. Although he did not have a match at the PPV, he did interfere in a match and he did perform at the house shows during this UK tour. In addition to pranking other wrestlers with shaving cream, he said sexually vulgar things to Doyle before passing out. Curt Hennig, known for being a prankster, also pranked wrestlers with the shaving cream, including Brock Lesnar, which resulted in a shoot fight between the two that almost caused them to accidentally open the plane's emergency exit. Goldust also said vulgar things to Cappellano, and later got on the public address system and started to sing a song for his ex-wife and fellow wrestler, Terri Runnels, who was also on the plane. Additionally, Ric Flair exposed himself to both flight attendants and allegedly grabbed their hands and had them touch his genitalia; Flair denied the accusations. Both Hall and Hennig were fired following the event, while Goldust and Flair were also reprimanded by the company. A 2004 lawsuit was filed by both Cappellano and Doyle, although WWE settled out of court with both women. Vice's Dark Side of the Ring series covered the incident in September 2021.

Results

Other on-screen talent

See also

Professional wrestling in the United Kingdom

References

2002 WWE pay-per-view events
2002 in England
Events in London
WWE Insurrextion
May 2002 events in the United Kingdom
Professional wrestling in England
WWE Raw